Vincent Belorgey (born 31 July 1975), known professionally as Kavinsky, is a French musician, producer, DJ, and actor. His production style is reminiscent of the electropop film soundtracks of the 1980s. Kavinsky claims that his music is inspired by thousands of movies he watched as a young boy and that he has cherry-picked the best parts from them, consolidating them into one concept. Kavinsky has been compared to many similar French house artists, including Daft Punk and Danger. He achieved greater mainstream recognition after his song "Nightcall" was featured in the 2011 film Drive. His debut studio album, OutRun, was released in 2013.

Biography

After many years as an actor, Kavinsky's musical career started in 2005 after being inspired by his close friends Jackson Fourgeaud and Quentin Dupieux, the latter director also included Kavinsky's music in his film Steak. During this period Kavinsky produced his first single "Testarossa Autodrive" which was inspired by the Testarossa model of Ferrari (one of which Vincent drives in real life). Kavinsky presented the single to Quentin, who in turn presented it to a record label he had access to because of his filming career, and Kavinsky signed with Record Makers.

Kavinsky went on to release three EPs on the Record Makers label: Teddy Boy in 2006, 1986 a year later, and Nightcall with Lovefoxxx of CSS in 2010. Kavinsky toured alongside Daft Punk, The Rapture, Justice, and SebastiAn in 2007.

The SebastiAn remix of "Testarossa Autodrive" off the 1986 EP is featured in the video games Grand Theft Auto IV and Gran Turismo 5 Prologue. Kavinsky's single "Nightcall" was featured in the opening credits of the film Drive, and became a major hit soon after.

In December 2012 he released "ProtoVision" and on 25 February 2013 released his debut studio album OutRun.

In November 2021, he returned from his seven year hiatus with the lead single "Renegade" from his second studio album Reborn. The song is produced by Gaspard Augé and Victor Le Masne.

Character history
Kavinsky is a character made by Vincent Belorgey that has a striking resemblance to Vincent himself but the backstory does not follow anything in Belorgey's history. Kavinsky's story is that after crashing his Testarossa in 1986, he reappeared as a zombie in 2006 to make his own electronic music. Kavinsky's songs help tell his story; Vincent claims in an interview, "'Night Call' is just about the zombie guy [who] goes to his girlfriend's house and says okay I'm not the same, we need to talk", referring to Kavinsky going back to find his girlfriend after the crash who has already moved on with her life.

Equipment
In interview, Kavinsky stated that the entirety of Teddy Boy was written and recorded on a Yamaha DX7, which was famous and notable for the synth-pop sound of the 1980s. Kavinsky originally started making music on an old Apple computer given to him by his friend Mr. Oizo.

Discography

Studio albums

Extended plays

Singles

* Did not appear in the official Belgian Wallonia Ultratop 50 chart, but peaked at number 32 on the Ultratip chart.

Remixes

Music videos

Soundtracks

Video games

Filmography

References

External links
 
 
 
 
 Kavinsky on Bandcamp
 Kavinsky at Record Makers
 Fool's Gold: Interview with Kavinsky

1975 births
21st-century French male musicians
French DJs
French dance musicians
French house musicians
Living people
People from Seine-Saint-Denis
Synthwave musicians